Stuart Krohn (born November 9, 1962) is an American former professional rugby union player. At the University of California, Santa Barbara, he was an All-American in 1986. In Hong Kong, he played for Valley RFC for eight years, as the team won eight consecutive championships, and captained the international team at the 1993 Rugby World Cup Sevens and the 1997 Rugby World Cup Sevens.  Krohn was a member of the silver medal winning USA Men's Rugby Team at the 1993 Maccabiah Games in Israel, and a member of the gold medal winning team at the 1997 Maccabiah Games.

Youth and college

Krohn was born in Durham, North Carolina.  Krohn started playing rugby at the University of Colorado Boulder, for the Colorado Buffaloes in 1980. He transferred to the University of California, Santa Barbara (UCSB), and played rugby there for the UC Santa Barbara Gauchos. For his junior year, he went to study in France, where he played rugby, leading to a professional contract with Kronenbourg RFC in 1984. He dropped out of school to play rugby for a second year in France in 1985, for Stade Toulousain, and won the French National Rugby Championship with the team. Then he returned to UCSB and was the player-coach of the team. He was an All-American in 1986. In 1987, he graduated from UCSB with a bachelor’s degree in History.

Rugby career
He then went to New Zealand and played for the North Shore Rugby Football Club for two years. Krohn next went to Durban, South Africa, and played for the College Rovers professional rugby club for two years. 

Krohn went to Hong Kong where he was a Hong Kong international and played at forward/backrower/No. 8 for Valley RFC for eight years, as the team won eight consecutive championships.  There, he captained the international team at two Rugby World Cup Sevens.  He was a member of Hong Kong's Plate-winning side at the 1992 Sevens. He played on the Hong Kong 1993 Rugby World Cup Sevens squad in Pool D, and the Hong Kong 1997 Rugby World Cup Sevens squad in Pool D.

Then, Krohn returned to the US and completed a master's degree graduate program in creative writing at Dartmouth College while coaching Dartmouth Rugby there.  
In 1993, he began and directed a youth rugby program in South Los Angeles, California, as part of the Inner City Education Foundation. In 1999, Krohn started coaching and playing for the Santa Monica Rugby Club. 

At the 1993 Maccabiah Games in Israel, Krohn was a member of the silver medal winning USA Men's Rugby Team, at the 1997 Maccabiah Games he was a member of the gold medal winning team, and at the 2005 Maccabiah Games he was  Head Coach of the silver medal winning team.

He has a wife, Kazuki, and a daughter, Sakura.

Halls of fame
In 2014 Krohn was inducted into the Southern California Jewish Sports Hall of Fame, and in 2015 he was inducted into the Hong Kong Rugby Football Union’s Hall of Fame. In 2018, he was inducted into the Maccabi USA Rugby Hall of Fame.

References 

1962 births
Living people
American rugby union players
Hong Kong rugby union players
Hong Kong international rugby sevens players
Sportspeople from Durham, North Carolina
Male rugby sevens players
Colorado Buffaloes athletes
Dartmouth College alumni
American expatriate rugby union players
Stade Toulousain players
Competitors at the 1993 Maccabiah Games
UC Santa Barbara Gauchos athletes
United States international rugby sevens players
Expatriate rugby union players in Hong Kong
American expatriate sportspeople in Hong Kong
Valley RFC players
Competitors at the 1997 Maccabiah Games
Competitors at the 2005 Maccabiah Games
American expatriate sportspeople in New Zealand
American expatriate sportspeople in France
American expatriate sportspeople in South Africa
Expatriate rugby union players in New Zealand
Expatriate rugby union players in France
Expatriate rugby union players in South Africa
Naturalised citizens of the People's Republic of China in Hong Kong
Jewish rugby union players
Naturalised sports competitors
Jewish American sportspeople